Geert Wilders (born 6 September 1963) is a Dutch politician who has led the Party for Freedom (Partij voor de Vrijheid – PVV) since he founded it in 2006. He is also the party's leader in the House of Representatives (Tweede Kamer), having held a parliamentary seat since 1998. In the 2010 formation of the First Rutte cabinet, a minority government of the People's Party for Freedom and Democracy (VVD)—which he left in 2004—and Christian Democratic Appeal (CDA), Wilders actively participated in the negotiations, resulting in a "tolerance agreement" (gedoogakkoord) between the PVV and these parties. He withdrew his party's parliamentary support in 2012, citing disagreements with the cabinet over proposed budget cuts. Wilders is best known for his criticism of Islam and the European Union (EU); his views have made him a controversial figure in the Netherlands and abroad. Since 2004, he has been protected at all times by armed police.

Raised a Roman Catholic, Wilders left the church at his coming of age. His travels to Israel and the greater Middle East as a young adult helped form his political views. Wilders worked as a speechwriter for the conservative-liberal People's Party for Freedom and Democracy (Volkspartij voor Vrijheid en Democratie – VVD); he later served as parliamentary assistant to party leader Frits Bolkestein from 1990 to 1998. He entered the municipal council of Utrecht in 1997. The following year he entered the House of Representatives. Citing irreconcilable differences over the party's position on the accession of Turkey to the European Union, he left the VVD in 2004 to form his own party, the Party for Freedom.

Wilders has campaigned to stop what he views as the "Islamisation of the Netherlands". He has compared the Quran to Mein Kampf and has campaigned to have the book banned in the Netherlands. He advocates ending immigration from Muslim countries, and supports banning the construction of new mosques. Wilders was a speaker at the Facing Jihad Conference held in Israel in 2008, which discussed the dangers of jihad, and has called for a hard line against what he called "street terror" exerted by minorities in Dutch cities. His controversial 2008 film featuring his views on Islam, Fitna, received international attention and extreme criticism. His party was also sued because content was used in his film without permission. He has been described in the media as populist and labeled far-right. Wilders rejects being labeled as far-right and views himself as a right-wing liberal, while saying he does not want to be "linked with the wrong rightist fascist groups". More recently, however, Wilders worked together with Marine Le Pen of the French National Front in an initially ill-fated, but eventually successful attempt to form a parliamentary group in the European Parliament which now includes parties from nine member states, among them Austria's Freedom Party, Italy's Northern League and Belgium's Flemish Interest.

Geert Wilders has been charged in relation to incitement multiple times. Wilders was first accused of criminally insulting religious and ethnic groups and inciting hatred and discrimination. He was found not guilty in 2011. In 2016, he landed in court again and was found guilty of incitement and encouraging discrimination against Moroccan immigrants to the Netherlands, but faced no punishment. The verdict was later overturned.

Early life and career 
Wilders was born on 6 September 1963 in the city of Venlo, in the province of Limburg. He is the youngest of four children, and was raised Catholic. He was born to a Dutch father and a mother born in colonial Indonesia, whose background was mixed Dutch and Indonesian. His father worked as a manager for the printing and copying manufacturing company Océ, and had hidden from the Germans during the Second World War, an experience so traumatizing that he refused to physically enter Germany even forty years later.

Wilders received his secondary education at the Mavo and Havo middle school and high school in Venlo. Reflecting passions that came to the fore later in his career, Wilders took a course in health insurance at the Stichting Opleiding Sociale Verzekeringen in Amsterdam and earned several law certificates at the Dutch Open University.

Wilders' goal after he graduated from secondary school was to see the world. Because he did not have enough money to travel to Australia, his preferred destination, he went to Israel instead and volunteered for a year in a moshav, Tomer, on the West Bank. With the money he saved, he travelled to the neighbouring Arab countries, and was moved by the lack of democracy in the region. When he returned to the Netherlands, he retained Israeli ideas about counter-terrorism and a "special feeling of solidarity" for the country.

Living in Utrecht, Wilders initially worked in the health insurance industry. His interest in the subject led him into politics as a speech-writer for the Netherlands' People's Party for Freedom and Democracy. He started his formal political career as a parliamentary assistant to the party leader Frits Bolkestein, specialising in foreign policy. He held this job from 1990 to 1998. During this time Geert Wilders travelled extensively, visiting countries all across the Middle East, including Iran, Syria, Jordan, Egypt and Israel. Bolkestein was the first Dutch politician to address the consequences of mass immigration for Dutch society, including a sharp criticism of Muslim immigrants. He set an example for Wilders not only in his ideas but also in his confrontational speaking style. Political analyst Anno Bunnik later described Wilders as a "sorcerer's apprentice" to Bolkestein.

Personal life 
On 10 November 2004, two suspected attackers were captured after an hour-long siege of a building in The Hague. They were in possession of three grenades and were accused of planning to murder Wilders as well as a fellow MP, Ayaan Hirsi Ali. The suspects were presumed to be members of what the Dutch intelligence agency, the General Intelligence and Security Service, has termed the Hofstad Network (Hofstadgroep). Since this incident Wilders has been under constant security protection because of frequent threats to his life. In September 2007, a Dutch woman was sentenced to a one-year prison term for sending more than 100 threatening emails to Wilders. In 2009, a rapper from Rotterdam was sentenced to 80 hours community service and a two-month suspended jail term for threatening Wilders in a rap song. Wilders was listed as the most threatened politician in the Netherlands in 2008.

Wilders is said to have been "deprived... of a personal life for his... hatred of Islam". He is constantly accompanied by a permanent security detail of about six plainclothes police officers, and does not receive visitors unless they are cleared in advance, thoroughly searched, and escorted at all times. He lives in a state-provided safe house which is outfitted to be bulletproof, is heavily guarded by police, and has a panic room. He is driven from his home to his offices in parliament in an armored police vehicle, and wears a bulletproof vest. His office is located in the most isolated corner of the Dutch Parliament building, and was chosen because potential terrorists can get to it through only one corridor, making it easier for his bodyguards to repel an attack. He is married to Krisztina Wilders (née Márfai), a former diplomat from Hungary of Jewish origin. The restrictions on his life, he said, are "a situation that I wouldn't wish on my worst enemy".

In January 2010, Karen Geurtsen, a Dutch journalist from the magazine HP-De Tijd, revealed a painful breach of security. She spent four months working undercover, posing as an intern, for the PVV party. She claimed that she had had unchecked access to Wilders. "I could have killed him", were the first words of the article that she published about this operation. According to her, she had "dozens" of opportunities to take his life. In July 2010, after Wilders complained that his security was inadequate, the Special Security Assignments Brigade, a special unit of Dutch military police, made four attempts to smuggle a firearm into the heavily guarded offices of Wilders' Freedom Party, two of which were successful. Following these breaches, security at the offices was increased.

In June 2011, disclosure of Wilder's personal finances indicated that he founded a self-administered company one year earlier without reporting this via the public records of the House of Representatives, which he, as a parliamentarian, should have done.

Wilders has been dying his hair since at least the mid 1990s having previously gotten his hair cut at a barber shop near Utrecht Central Station until this was stopped due to security concerns. As a result of aging, Wilders' dark roots no longer show up due to increased graying. Wilders has acquired nicknames such as "Mozart" and "Captain Peroxide" because of his flamboyant platinum blond hairstyle. Radio Netherlands calls him "the most famous bleach-blond since Marilyn Monroe".

Religious views 
Wilders is an agnostic, but he has stated that he thinks Christians "are my allies" and that they fundamentally should want the same thing.

Political career 
In 1997, Wilders was elected for the People's Party for Freedom and Democracy (VVD) to the municipal council of Utrecht, the fourth largest city of the Netherlands. He lived in Kanaleneiland, a suburb with cheap social housing and high apartment blocks, which has a relatively high number of immigrants. While a city councilor, Wilders was mugged in his own neighbourhood; some have speculated that this may have catalysed his political transformation. He was not rewarded for his time on the municipal council of Utrecht, for in the following elections he would score well below the national average in the University city.

A year later, he was elected to the Netherlands' national parliament, but his first four years in parliament drew little attention. However, his appointment in 2002 as a public spokesman for the VVD led Wilders to become more well known for his outspoken criticism of Islamic extremism. Tensions immediately developed within the party, as Wilders found himself to be to the right of most members, and challenged the party line in his public statements. He was expelled from the VVD parliamentary party, and in September 2004, Wilders left the VVD, having been a member since 1989, to form his own political party, Groep Wilders, later renamed the Party for Freedom. The crunch issue with the VVD party line was about his refusal to endorse the party's position that European Union accession negotiations must be started with Turkey.

The Party for Freedom's political platform often overlaps those of the assassinated Rotterdam politician Pim Fortuyn and his Pim Fortuyn List. After his death, Fortuyn's impact remained, as more and more politicians sought to gain political mileage by directly confronting topics such as a ban on immigration that were, from a politically correct point of view, considered unmentionable in the Netherlands until Fortuyn came on the scene and upended the Dutch tradition of consensus politics with an anti-immigration stance. Wilders would position himself to inherit Fortuyn's constituency. The Party for Freedom called for a €16 billion tax reduction, a far stricter policy toward recreational drug use, investing more in roads and other infrastructure, building nuclear power plants and including animal rights in the Dutch constitution. In the 2006 Dutch parliamentary election, their first parliamentary election, the Party for Freedom won 9 out of the 150 open seats.

In March 2009, in a party meeting in Venlo, Wilders said "I want to be prime minister", believing the PVV will eventually become the Netherlands' biggest party. "At some point it's going to happen and then it will be a big honour to fulfil the post of prime minister".

Polling conducted throughout March 2009 by Maurice de Hond indicated the Party for Freedom was the most popular parliamentary party. The polls predicted that the party would take 21% of the national vote, winning 32 out of 150 seats in the Dutch parliament. If the polling results were replicated in an election, Wilders would be a major power broker. Under such circumstances, there would also be some likelihood of him becoming Prime Minister of the Netherlands. This has been partially attributed to timely prosecution attempts against him for hate speech and the travel ban imposed on him by the United Kingdom, as well as dissatisfaction with the Dutch government's response to the global financial crisis of 2008–2009.

On 3 March 2010, elections for the local councils were held in the municipalities of The Netherlands. The PVV only contested these local elections in the Dutch towns The Hague and Almere, because of a shortage of good candidates. The big gains that were scored indicated that the party and Wilders might dominate the political scene in the run-up to the parliamentary elections scheduled on 9 June 2010. The PVV won in Almere and came second to the Dutch Labour party in The Hague. In Almere, the PVV won 21 percent of the vote to Labour's 18 percent, preliminary results showed. In The Hague, the PVV had 8 seats—second to Labour with 10 seats.

On 8 March 2010, Wilders announced that he would take a seat on the Hague city council, after it became clear he won 13,000 preference votes. Earlier he had said he would not take up a seat if he won.
In the parliamentary elections on 9 June 2010, the PVV increased its number of seats from 9 to 24 (out of 150), getting 15.5% of the vote. This made the PVV the third party in size. With a fragmented parliament, at least three parties were required for an absolute majority. A coalition of VVD and Christian Democratic Appeal (CDA) was negotiated with parliamentary support by the PVV. The PVV did not become part of the government formed by VVD and CDA but actively participated in the negotiations and thus policy decisions and – as part of the outcome agreed that they would not support any motion to dismiss ministers concerning topics listed in a so-called "support agreement" – much like the Danish model where the Danish People's Party plays a similar role. The very fact of the participation of Wilders' party in these negotiations caused fierce discussions in political circles.

On 21 April 2012, Wilders withdrew his support from the Rutte cabinet because of new austerity measures that were about to be taken. Commenting on his withdrawal Wilders blamed the "European dictates" pointing to the 3% rule on budget deficit for European countries although his party had supported these rules earlier on. The cabinet blamed Wilders for what they call his "lack of political will" and "political cowardice" in regards to addressing the economic woes of the Netherlands. Wilders' withdrawal from the negotiations led to new elections in September. Wilders and the PVV ran on a campaign to have the Netherlands withdraw from the European Union and for a return to the guilder. The PVV won 10.1% of the vote and 15 seats in parliament, a loss of 9 seats.

In the March 2014 local elections, Wilders' Party for Freedom only took part in two municipalities, The Hague and Almere, and suffered minor losses in both. Nevertheless, international news coverage of the elections was dominated by Wilders after he led his supporters in a provocative chant (calling for "fewer, fewer ... Moroccans") at an election night party rally. This eventually led to a new trial against him (see ).

In the May 2014 elections for the European Parliament, the Party for Freedom received 17.0% of the vote and four seats, a slight gain compared to the 13.3% of the vote the party had received in the previous parliamentary elections. In the run-up to and aftermath of those European elections, Wilders worked with the French Front National's Marine Le Pen to try to form a new parliamentary group in the European Parliament. They first announced their collaboration during a joint press conference in November 2013, where Wilders vowed that "today is the beginning of the liberation from the European elite, the monster in Brussels". Wilders visited the Sweden Democrats party and spoke with the Austrian Freedom party's leader Heinz-Christian Strache to help bring about the alliance, even while rejecting Hungary's Jobbik and Germany's NPD because he wanted to exclude "right-wing extremist and racist" parties. Three days after the elections finished, Le Pen and Wilders presented another press conference, this time with Matteo Salvini of Italy's Northern League, Harald Vilimsky of Austria's Freedom Party and Gerolf Annemans of Belgium's Flemish Interest party, to promise that the parliamentary group would be formed. Eventually, however, the effort failed because it could only unite parties from six EU member states, one fewer than is required by parliamentary rules. This was in part due to a refusal to include the Greek Golden Dawn or Poland's Congress of the New Right, and in part because parties like the Danish People's party and the True Finns refused to join.

In the March 2015 provincial elections, the Party for Freedom received 11.7% of the vote nationally, slipping slightly from the 12.4% of the vote it had gotten in the 2011 provincial elections.

The PVV contested the 2017 general election with Wilders at its helm. Although the PVV led other parties in opinion polls most of the time, all major parties ruled out forming coalitions with the PVV, effectively locking it out from any chance of taking part in, let alone leading, the next government. This raised the prospect of the PVV being locked out of power even if it won the most seats. Wilders hinted that a "revolution" would occur if his party won the most seats and was still shut out of government.

The PVV ended up achieving second place after winning 20 seats, 5 more than in 2012.

Public reception
Wilders has become a controversial figure with polarized opinions on him from the world news media. Regarding his reputation in the Netherlands, Wilders stated in 2009, "Half of Holland loves me and half of Holland hates me. There is no in-between." In 2005, the Dutch public expressed mixed reactions to Wilders' general agenda, with 53% calling it "implausible" and 47% more supportive.
He has been described as populist, labelled as both "extreme right" and far-right, and defended by others as a mainstream politician with legitimate concerns saying that such labels are shallow smear attempts. Wilders himself rejects the labels and has called such descriptions "scandalous". He has been accused of building his popularity on fear and resentment and vociferously defended for having the courage to talk openly about the problems unfettered immigration brings with it and the incompatibility of fundamentalist Islam with western values.

On 15 December 2007, Wilders was declared "Politician of the Year" by NOS-radio, a mainstream Dutch radio station. The parliamentary press praised his ability to dominate political discussion and to attract the debate and to get into publicity with his well-timed one-liners. The editors eventually gave the title to Wilders because he was the only one who scored high among both the press and the general public.

In December 2009, Wilders came in second in two polls in the Netherlands for Politician of the Year. A panel of Dutch television viewers praised him as "the second best" politician this year (after his outspoken critic Alexander Pechtold), while his colleagues in parliament named him "the second worst" (after Rita Verdonk).

Some Muslim critics of Wilders accuse him of using Quranic verses out of context, and of manipulating verses to have a different meaning than the verses intended to. Wilders' views on Islam prompted the Mayor of Rotterdam, Ahmed Aboutaleb, to reprimand him.

Editorials by The Montreal Gazette, The Wall Street Journal, The Guardian, and The New York Times have accused Wilders of hypocrisy given that, in their view, Wilders has called for the ban of the sale of the Quran while simultaneously arguing for his own personal freedom of speech. In a speech during a Dutch parliamentary debate, Wilders elaborated that he calls for the consistent application of Dutch laws restricting any act of expression that incites violence. Ideally, he would prefer to see nearly all such laws abolished.

Wilders has also been compared to the assassinated fellow critic of Islam and filmmaker Theo van Gogh, but he does not see himself as taking on van Gogh's mantle. Wilders has stated that he supports the free speech rights of his critics, saying that "An Imam who wants a politician dead is—however reprehensible—allowed to say so". He has responded to critics' comments of racism and Islamophobia by stating, "I don't hate Muslims. I hate their book and their ideology".

In February 2010, the trailer of a newly published online satirical video on the website of the Dutch radio station FunX, which targets a young urban audience, spoofed a murder attempt on Wilders.

In July 2010, the magazine Inspire announced that Wilders, as well as Ayaan Hirsi Ali, Kurt Westergaard and Salman Rushdie, were mentioned on a "death list" of an international Islamist terrorist network.

Shortly before this publication, it was revealed in The Hague that Dutch law enforcement officers succeeded twice in smuggling a firearm into the parliament buildings and into the guarded headquarters of Wilders' party. This check was carried out by the Special Security Assignments Brigade BSB, a special unit of the Dutch Military Police. The test was carried out following a complaint from Wilders about his security being inadequate.

On 11 September 2010, 2,000 people gathered close by the site of a planned Muslim community center near the site of the World Trade Center attacks, on 11 September 2001, where they were addressed by Wilders who flew from The Netherlands to urge the crowd: "This is where we have (to) draw the line. We must never give a free hand to those who want to subjugate us," Wilders added. "Draw this line so that New York... will never become New Mecca."

Wilders was extensively discussed in American diplomatic cables, released by WikiLeaks in December 2010. In a briefing to president Barack Obama, he was described as "no friend of the US: he opposes Dutch military involvement in Afghanistan; he believes development assistance is money wasted; he opposes NATO missions outside 'allied' territory; he is against most EU initiatives; and, most troubling, he foments fear and hatred of immigrants."

In July 2011, Anders Behring Breivik, the man who carried out the 2011 Norway attacks, expressed admiration for Geert Wilders and the Party for Freedom. Wilders immediately distanced himself strongly from Breivik.

On 2 October 2011 Radio Netherlands Worldwide reported that a retired Dutch politician of the People's Party for Freedom and Democracy (VVD) Frits Bolkestein, who is sometime called the 'mentor' of Geert Wilders, "does not share his views". He reportedly said that "Wilders says things that are just not right and I think he totally exaggerates." While giving his opinion on burqa ban Mr Bolkestein said that he "disagrees with the recent introduction of a burqa ban, an idea championed by Geert Wilders." The Netherlands, he said, is the third European country to introduce such a ban after France and Belgium. "A ban makes martyrs of the few burqa wearers there are in the Netherlands", he said.

In March 2014 and during a party meeting in The Hague on the evening of local elections, he sparked widespread controversy when he asked his attending supporters "Do you want, in this city, and in the Netherlands, more or fewer Moroccans?", after which they chanted "Fewer! Fewer!". Wilders' response was "Then we'll fix it!". This action led several PVV representatives to resign, among whom two of the party's members of Parliament (Roland van Vliet and Joram van Klaveren), the party's leader in the European Parliament (Laurence Stassen), and a number of its provincial legislators and municipal councillors. Many politicians denounced what happened. In response, a number of young Moroccans launched a social media campaign called 'Born here', in which they posted pictures of themselves alongside their Dutch passports.

In October 2020, Turkish President Recep Tayyip Erdoğan sued Wilders after he posted a series of tweets against Erdoğan and urged NATO to take Turkey out of the bloc. Dutch Prime Minister Mark Rutte said that a legal case "against a Dutch politician that could possibly even lead to a curtailment of freedom of expression is not acceptable."

Political positions

Political principles 
Wilders generally considers himself to be a right-wing liberal, with a specific mix of positions independent of the European political spectrum and peculiar to iconoclastic Dutch society.  He has stated, "My allies are not Le Pen or Haider ... We'll never join up with the fascists and Mussolinis of Italy.  I'm very afraid of being linked with the wrong rightist fascist groups", adding that his drive instead is such issues as freedom of expression and Dutch iconoclasm. Wilders views British Prime Minister Margaret Thatcher as his greatest political role model. People's Party for Freedom and Democracy figure Frits Bolkestein also heavily influenced his beliefs.

Wilders strongly opposes the Dutch political system in general.  He believes that there is a ruling elite of parliamentarians who only care about their own personal careers and disregard the will of the people.  He also blames the Dutch system of multiparty coalition governments for a lack of clear and effective policies. In his view, Dutch society advocates rule by consensus and cultural relativism, while he believes that this should change so as "not [to] tolerate the intolerant".

On foreign relations, Wilders has largely supported Israel and has criticized countries he perceives as enemies of Israel. Further, he has made some proposals in the Dutch Parliament inspired by Israeli policies:  for example, he supports implementing Israeli-style administrative detention in the Netherlands, a practice heavily criticized by human rights groups but which Wilders calls "common sense".

Wilders often mentions Henk and Ingrid in his speeches, fictitious ordinary Dutch subjects for whom he claims to work. Henk and Ingrid represent "the Average Joe" in Dutch political parlance, the "heart and backbone of Dutch society". They have been compared to Joe the Plumber in Dutch media (though "Joe" is a real person). Henk and Ingrid live in a Vinex neighbourhood, have two school-attending children and a median income; both work outside the home.  They used to vote for the PvdA but now vote for the PVV.

Wilders has also revived the old idea of reuniting Flanders with the Netherlands.

Wilders published the version of his political manifesto called Klare Wijn ("Clear Wine") in March 2006.  The program proposed the implementation of ten key points:
 Considerable reduction of taxes and state regulations;
 Replacement of the present Article 1 of the Dutch constitution, guaranteeing equality under the law, by a clause stating the cultural dominance of the Christian, Jewish and humanist traditions;
 Reduction of the influence of the European Union, which may no longer be expanded with new member states, especially Turkey; the European Parliament would be abolished; Dutch financial contributions to the European Union would be reduced by billions of euros;
 A five-year moratorium on the immigration of non-Western foreigners who intend to stay in the Netherlands; foreign residents no longer would have the right to vote in municipal elections;
 A five-year moratorium on the founding of new mosques and Islamic schools and a permanent ban on preaching in any language other than Dutch; foreign imams would not be allowed to preach; radical mosques would be closed, and radical Muslims would be expelled;
 Restoration of educational standards, with an emphasis on the educational value of the family;
 Introduction of binding referendums and elected mayors, chiefs of police, and prime ministers;
 Introduction of minimum criminal penalties and higher maximum penalties; introduction of administrative detention for terror suspects; street terrorism would be punished by boot camps and denaturalisation and deportation of immigrant offenders;
 Restoration of respect and better compensation for teachers, policemen, health care workers, and military personnel;
 Instead of complicated reorganisation, a more accessible and humane health care system, especially for elderly citizens.

Views on Islam 

Wilders is best known for his criticism of Islam, summing up his views by saying, "I don't hate Muslims, I hate Islam". His brother Paul claimed in an interview that, in his private affairs, Wilders has no problems with Muslims. Although identifying Islamic extremists as 5–15% of Muslims, he argues that "there is no such thing as 'moderate Islam and that the "Koran also states that Muslims who believe in only part of the Koran are in fact apostates". He suggests that Muslims should "tear out half of the Koran if they wished to stay in the Netherlands" because it contains "terrible things" and that Muhammad would "... in these days be hunted down as a terrorist".

On 8 August 2007, Wilders opined in an open letter to the Dutch newspaper De Volkskrant that the Koran, which he called a "fascist book", should be outlawed in the Netherlands, like Adolf Hitler's Mein Kampf. He has stated that "The book incites hatred and killing and therefore has no place in our legal order". He has also referred to Mohammed as "the devil". In September 2009, Wilders proposed putting what he called a "head rag tax" on Hijab wearing by Muslim women; he suggested that women could purchase a license for €1000 and that the money raised could be used in projects beneficial to women's emancipation.

He believes that all Muslim immigration to the Netherlands should be halted and all settled immigrants should be paid to leave. Referring to the increased population of Muslims in the Netherlands, he has said: 

In a speech before the Dutch Parliament, he stated: 

Nonetheless, Wilders has traveled widely in the Arab world and Der Spiegel has stated that Wilders will "wax poetic" over those "magnificent countries". Wilders has also said that "It's a real shame that these places are so chaotic."

Wilders argues that Islam is not a religion, but rather a totalitarian political ideology such as communism and fascism.

In May 2014, Dutch Foreign Minister Timmermans condemned Wilders' anti-Islam sticker, saying that "The Netherlands cannot be held responsible for the adolescent behavior of a single parliamentarian." Timmermans said that Saudi Arabia is "deeply offended by the sticker action."

After the Dutch parliament turned down his request for an exhibition of cartoons depicting Muhammad be shown in parliament, Wilders vowed to show cartoons depicting him on television during time reserved for political parties.

On 28 July 2015, Vienna's prosecutors' office launched a probe and lodged calls for criminal proceedings against Geert Wilders for allegedly comparing the Quran to Mein Kampf, after Tarafa Baghajati had accused him of hate speech and denigrating religious teachings.

After the November 2015 Paris attacks, Wilders, in an article in The New York Times, argued for a national referendum in the Netherlands to decide about the refugee crisis.

Views on Israel 
Wilders lived in Israel for two years during his youth and has visited the country 40 times in the last 25 years.

Wilders stated about Israel: "I have visited many interesting countries in the Middle East – from Syria to Egypt, from Tunisia to Turkey, from Cyprus to Iran – but nowhere did I have the special feeling of solidarity that I always get when I land at Ben Gurion International Airport." Dutch public TV channel Nederland 2's daily news programme Netwerk reported that numerous American supporters of Israel financially supported Wilders' Party for Freedom (PVV) and openly approved of his message towards Islam and Islamic terrorism. Wilders told an audience during the report that "We [in the West] are all Israel". He has also said "Israel is the West's first line of defence" against what he perceives to be a threat posed by Islam.

Following the 2010 Dutch general election, in which the PVV was the third biggest party, Wilders said Jordan should be renamed Palestine. The Jordanian government responded saying Wilders' speech was reminiscent of the Israeli right wing. His speech said "Jordan is Palestine. Changing its name to Palestine will end the conflict in the Middle East and provide the Palestinians with an alternate homeland." He also said Israel deserves a special status in the Dutch government because it was fighting for "Jerusalem" in its name. "If Jerusalem falls into the hands of the Muslims, Athens and Rome will be next. Thus, Jerusalem is the main front protecting the West. It is not a conflict over territory but rather an ideological battle, between the mentality of the liberated West and the ideology of Islamic barbarism. There has been an independent Palestinian state since 1946, and it is the kingdom of Jordan."

He called on the Dutch government to refer to Jordan as Palestine and move its embassy to Jerusalem.

Fitna 

Fitna is a 2008 short film written and commissioned by Wilders that explores Koranic-inspired motivations for terrorism, Islamic universalism, and Islam in the Netherlands. Its title comes from the Arabic word fitna, which means a "test of faith in times of trial", or refers to a situation where one's faith is tested.

It is the subject of an international controversy and debate on free speech. Despite the legal troubles surrounding the film, Wilders insists that before he released it, he consulted numerous lawyers in the field, who found nothing worth prosecution. Jordan has summoned Wilders to court, with the film deemed to "incite hatred". Militant Sunni Islamist group Al-Qaeda issued a call to murder Wilders after its release.

In the spring of 2009, Wilders launched the "Facing Jihad World Tour", a series of screenings of Fitna to public officials and influential organizations around the globe, starting in Rome. In the United States, Wilders showed the film to the United States Congress on 26 February, having been invited by Arizona Republican Senator Jon Kyl. Around 40 people attended the screening. American Muslims protested, but the groups said that they supported his right of free speech while still condemning his opinions. Wilders appeared before the National Press Club and the Republican Jewish Coalition that week as well. Similar attempts in Britain led to a travel ban, and legislative blocks have prevented an appearance in Denmark.

Death threats

Call for beheading by Feiz Mohammad 
In September 2010, in an internet chat room, Australian Islamic fundamentalist preacher Feiz Mohammad urged his followers to behead Wilders. His rationale was his accusation that Wilders had "denigrat[ed]" Islam, and that anyone who "mocks, laughs or degrades Islam" as Wilders had must be killed "by chopping off his head." The Dutch newspaper De Telegraaf released an excerpt of the talk, after Dutch intelligence officials received a tip about the threat.

After the 2013 Boston Marathon bombing, Wilders wrote:I am threatened for the simple reason that I am an Islam critic. But, make no mistake, I am not the only one who is in danger. The Tsarnaev brothers drew inspiration from Feiz Mohammed's internet rants and decided to kill innocent onlookers at a marathon. Everyone is in danger.

Al-Qaeda hit list
In 2010 Anwar al-Awlaki published a hit list in his Inspire magazine, including Wilders, Ayaan Hirsi Ali and Salman Rushdie along with cartoonists Lars Vilks and three Jyllands-Posten staff members: Kurt Westergaard, Carsten Juste, and Flemming Rose. The list was later expanded to include Stéphane "Charb" Charbonnier, who was murdered in a terror attack on Charlie Hebdo in Paris, along with 11 other people. After the attack, Al-Qaeda called for more killings.

2018 death threats and trials 
Pakistani male Junaid I. was arrested in the Den Haag Centraal railway station after having posted a video with threats against Wilders on Facebook the previous day. He had been enraged about a Muhammad cartoon contest announced by Wilders. In 2019, Junaid I was sentenced to ten years in prison as an attack on a parliamentarian constitutes an attack on Dutch rule of law, the convict had showed an interest in violent extremism and the great risk of recurrence. In February 2021, the appeals court came to the same verdict and sentence.

2022 BJP Muhammad remarks controversy 
Wilders said he had received hundreds of death threats after he supported Indian politician Nupur Sharma's comments on Muhammad that caused controversy. He remained defiant, claiming to stand for freedom. After the murder of a Hindu tailor by two Muslim men, he cautioned the people of India against 'appeasement of Islam'.

In the United Kingdom

Ban on entering the United Kingdom 
Lord Pearson of Rannoch and Baroness Cox, members of the House of Lords (the upper chamber of the British Parliament), invited Wilders to a show of 12 February 2009 viewing of Fitna in the Palace of Westminster. Two days before the showing, Home Secretary Jacqui Smith banned Wilders from entering the United Kingdom, labeling him an "undesirable person". Entry was denied under EU law, and reportedly supported under regulation 19 of the Immigration (European Economic Area) Regulations 2006, an EU law which allows a member state to refuse entry to individuals if they are regarded as constituting a threat to public policy, security or health. A Home Office spokesperson elaborated that "The Government opposes extremism in all its forms ... and that was the driving force behind tighter rules on exclusions for unacceptable behaviour that the Home Secretary announced in October last year"

Wilders defied the ban and took a British Midland Airways flight from Amsterdam to London Heathrow Airport on 12 February, accompanied by television crews. Upon arrival, he was quickly detained by UK Border Agency officials, and deported on one of the next flights to the Netherlands. He called Prime Minister Gordon Brown "the biggest coward in Europe" and remarked, "Of course I will come back". Wilders had visited the United Kingdom in December 2008 without any problem. In response to the ban, both Pearson and Cox accused the government of "appeasing" militant Islam.

The International Herald Tribune stated that the ban was broadly condemned in the British news media. The Dutch Foreign Secretary, Maxime Verhagen, called the decision "highly regrettable" and complained to his British counterpart. Dutch Prime Minister Jan Peter Balkenende complained to Gordon Brown about the "disappointing" decision. The Quilliam Foundation, a British think tank, criticised the ban, as did National Secular Society president Terry Sanderson. The Muslim Labour peer Lord Ahmed expressed support for Smith's ban on Wilders entering the country; the Ramadhan Foundation and the Muslim Council of Britain also did so, the council labeling Wilders "an open and relentless preacher of hate".

Ban overturned 
After being declared persona non grata by Jacqui Smith, then the Home Secretary, in February 2009, Wilders appealed the decision to Britain's Asylum and Immigration Tribunal. In October 2009, the tribunal overturned the ban. Wilders subsequently praised the ruling as "a triumph for freedom of speech" and stated that he planned to visit the United Kingdom in the near future.

The ruling was criticized by the British Home Office, which stated that an appeal of the tribunal's ruling is being considered. A spokesman stated: "The Government opposes extremism in all its forms. The decision to refuse Wilders admission was taken on the basis that his presence could have inflamed tensions between our communities and have led to inter-faith violence. We still maintain this view."

Visits to the UK 
On 16 October 2009, Wilders arrived in the United Kingdom and was quickly forced to move his press conference due to protests by about forty members of the organization Islam4UK, an organization that was later shut down under the UK's Terrorism Act 2000 on 14 January 2010. Although the Home Office had asserted that his entry into the country would not be blocked, a spokesman said his "statements and behaviour during a visit will inevitably impact on any future decisions to admit him." His visit to the UK met with protest, but Wilders called it "a victory" in a press conference. On his outspoken views on Islam, he said: "I have a problem with the Islamic ideology, the Islamic culture, because I feel that the more Islam that we get in our societies the less freedom we get." He opened the press conference with a quote from George Orwell's preface to Animal Farm: "If liberty means anything at all, it means the right to tell people what they don't want to hear". Lord Pearson, who had invited him, said his arrival was "a celebration of the victory of freedom of speech over those who would prevent it in this country, particularly the Islamists, the violent Jihadists who are on the march across the world and in the UK."

In January 2010, Wilders was invited again to show his anti-Quran movie Fitna in the British House of Lords by UK Independence Party (UKIP) Lord Pearson, and cross-bencher Baroness Cox. Wilders accepted the invitation and was present for a showing of the movie in the House of Lords on 5 March. In his speech he quoted ominous words from Winston Churchill's book The River War from 1899: "Mohammedanism is a militant and proselytizing faith. No stronger retrograde force exists in the World. It has already spread throughout Central Africa, raising fearless warriors at every step ... the civilization of modern Europe might fall, as fell the civilization of ancient Rome."

At the ensuing press conferences, he called the Islamic prophet Muhammad a "barbarian, a mass murderer, and a pedophile" and referred to Islam as a "fascist ideology" which was "violent, dangerous, and retarded". Wilders also reportedly called Turkish Prime Minister Erdoğan a "total freak". Dutch Prime Minister Jan-Peter Balkenende called these comments "irresponsible", and Maxime Verhagen, Dutch caretaker Minister of Foreign Affairs, publicly condemned Wilders's remarks and behaviour: "He incites discord among people in a distasteful manner. And in the meantime he damages the interests of the Dutch population and the reputation of the Netherlands in the world."

Bernard Wientjes, the president of the Dutch employers' organization Confederation of Netherlands Industry and Employers (VNO-NCW), also accused Wilders of "seriously" damaging Dutch interests abroad. He called it outrageous that Wilders had presented himself in London as "the next Dutch prime minister" and then derided Turkish Prime Minister Erdoğan. Emphasizing that three-quarters of the Dutch GDP comes from revenue earned abroad, according to Wientjes, Wilders poses "a serious threat to the Netherlands and the Dutch economy".

In Australia
In 2012, Wilders was invited by the Q Society of Australia to visit Australia. In August 2012 he applied for a visa to give two speeches in October 2012. His staff and police protection officers were granted visas within three days, but Wilders was not. On 2 October 2012 Immigration Minister Chris Bowen, while stating that Wilders' views were offensive, stated that he would not block the visa application. Bowen stated: "I have decided not to intervene to deny him a visa because I believe that our democracy is strong enough, our multiculturalism robust enough and our commitment to freedom of speech entrenched enough that our society can withstand the visit of a fringe commentator from the other side of the world".

On the same day, the Q Society put out a press release criticizing the delays in issuing a visa, saying that Chris Bowen's announcement was "too little, too late" and announcing that Wilders' visit would be pushed back to February 2013 as there were still no visa documents available.

In Germany 
In March 2010, Wilders was told he is "not welcome" in the western German tourist resort of Monschau in the Eifel area, after he spent a weekend there, along with several armed bodyguards. Mayor Margareta Ritter (CDU) said she was concerned that his presence tainted her town with the suspicion that it was sympathetic to his views. As a result, Monschau was said to have been unfairly connected with "extremism" in the European press. "Anyone who pollutes the integration debate in the Netherlands with poisonous right-wing populism as Wilders has, and advocates prohibition of the Koran by a comparison with Hitler's Mein Kampf, is not welcome in Monschau. I wanted to distinguish Monschau from that."

Ritter didn't say whether Wilders was enjoying a short vacation in her town or had been meeting with like-minded people. A demonstration to support Wilders was announced to take place in Berlin on 17 April.

The same year local Berlin politician for the CDU René Stadtkewitz was expelled from the CDU after he invited Wilders to Germany to hold a speech. In October 2010, Wilders supported the founding of Stadtkewitz's new German Freedom Party.

In April 2015, Wilders held a speech for Pegida in Dresden.

Other international initiatives 
Wilders is regarded as part of the international counter-jihad movement, and as "the most successful counter-jihadist politician in the world". He is also described as the "main counter-jihad standard bearer across Europe ... feted by campaigning organisations in North America". In July 2010, Wilders announced the International Freedom Alliance, a network of groups and individuals who "are fighting for freedom against Islam".

Wilders plans IFA branches in the United States, Canada, Britain, France and Germany by late 2010. "The message, 'stop Islam, defend freedom', is a message that's not only important for the Netherlands but for the whole free Western world", Wilders stated in an address to reporters at the Dutch Parliament. Wilders also stressed that the group would not contain far-right extremists.

On 6 August 2010, Wilders, who had become a regular guest with American conservatives and libertarians, announced that he would speak at a rally on 11 September in New York to protest the plans for Park51, a Muslim community center with a prayer space to be built near the World Trade Center site. The rally, to be held on the ten-year anniversary of the 11 September 2001 attacks, was organised by Stop Islamization of America, which was supported by former House speaker Newt Gingrich, who was originally announced as a speaker at the event, but never confirmed his appearance and cancelled a video appearance. According to SIOA's website world leaders, prominent politicians and 9/11 family members would be speaking at the rally, but Wilders was not mentioned by name, though he did attend as he had announced.

In political circles in The Netherlands, the announcement caused widespread irritation about his plan. Christian Democrat senator Hans Hillen remarked that Wilders' words could endanger Dutch interests. Former NATO general secretary Jaap de Hoop Scheffer advised Wilders not to make a speech, arguing that the international public does not know who is in the Dutch cabinet and who is in parliament and thus Wilders' speech could be mistaken as an official statement of the Dutch government. Also Christian Democrat party leader and acting Dutch Minister of Foreign Affairs Maxime Verhagen issued a warning.

Also, the Dutch Foreign Ministry allegedly would have issued guidelines to its embassies on how to react to questions about the role being played by the PVV and Wilders in the formation of a new government. On 10 August 2010, the website of Dutch daily newspaper NRC Handelsblad published the ministry memo. The ministry itself however had declined "to confirm or deny" the authenticity of these guidelines. One question posed is how Wilders could be taking part in negotiations on forming a government coalition when he has been indicted for inciting hatred and discrimination, and for insulting a group of persons. Other questions covered possible bans on the building of new mosques, on the Quran and on Islamic schools in the Netherlands. The memo stressed that such bans would breach the Dutch constitution.

Wilders spoke on Thursday, 12 May 2011, at Cornerstone Church in Madison, Tennessee, at the Tennessee Freedom Coalition inaugural Signature Series event.

In May 2015, Geert Wilders was invited to an art exhibit presented by Stop Islamization of America in Garland, Texas, that offered a $10,000 prize for the best drawing of Muhammad. Towards the end of the event, two gunmen opened fire outside, injuring a police officer before being shot dead by other police officers guarding the center.

Trials 

Several groups and persons in the Netherlands have called for legal action against Wilders, while others, including Christian fundamentalists, defended his right to free speech. On 15 August 2007, a representative of the Prosecutors' Office in Amsterdam declared that dozens of reports against Wilders had been filed, and that they were all being considered. Attempts to prosecute Wilders under Dutch anti-hate speech laws in June 2008 failed, with the public prosecutor's office stating that Wilders' comments contributed to the debate on Islam in Dutch society and also had been made outside parliament. The office released a statement reading: "That comments are hurtful and offensive for a large number of Muslims does not mean that they are punishable. Freedom of expression fulfils an essential role in public debate in a democratic society. That means that offensive comments can be made in a political debate."

On 21 January 2009, a three-judge court ordered prosecutors to try him.

The Middle East Forum established a Legal Defence Fund for Wilders's defence. The New York Times ran an op-ed criticizing his views and arguing that "for a man who calls for a ban on the Koran to act as the champion of free speech is a bit rich", concluding, however that the lawsuit against Wilders might not be "a good thing for democracy", because it made him "look more important than he should be."

A survey by Angus Reid Global Monitor found that public opinion is deeply split on the prosecution, with 50% supporting Wilders and 43% opposed. However, as of 2009, public support for the Party for Freedom had greatly increased since Wilders' legal troubles began, with the Party for Freedom virtually tied with the People's Party for Freedom and Democracy to be the third most popular party. According to Radio Netherlands, "Dutch politicians themselves seem to be keeping quiet on the issue; they are probably worried that media attention will only serve to make the controversial politician more popular".

In late October 2010, the Dutch court approved a request from Geert Wilders to have new judges appointed forcing the court to retry the case. On 7 February 2011, Wilders returned to the court room in order that his legal team could present evidence from Islamic experts which the court rejected in 2010, including Mohammed Bouyeri, who murdered film-maker Theo van Gogh, and Dutch academic Hans Jansen.

On 23 June 2011, Wilders was acquitted of all charges. A Dutch court said that his speech was legitimate political debate, but on the edge. Because both the public prosecutor and the defence requested complete acquittal, the verdict will most likely not be appealed.

2016 trial 
On 18 March 2016, a second trial against Wilders began, this time on the accusation of inciting "discrimination and hatred" against Moroccans living in the Netherlands. On 17 November 2016, the Dutch Public Prosecution Service demanded a fine against him of €5,000 (£4,300). On 9 December 2016, he was convicted in a hate speech trial but no penalty was imposed. That verdict was overturned in 2020 when a higher court found that while Wilders's remarks were insulting to an ethnic minority, they were found to be in the service of receiving political gains rather than inspiring discrimination.

Historical evaluation in the Netherlands
In the Netherlands, Wilders and his movement have been discussed in historical and psychological perspectives. 
Dutch philosopher  characterised Wilders and his movement in 2010 as "the prototype of contemporary fascism" after having defined fascism itself as "the politisation of the resentment of the man in the crowd", in line with previous definitions by Menno ter Braak, Albert Camus and Thomas Mann. 
Historian Robin te Slaa of NIOD Institute for War, Holocaust and Genocide Studies disagreed and concluded in 2012 that Wilders is no fascist in the historical sense. Wilders and his party do not formally subscribe to classical fascist tenets such as biological racism, social darwinism, an autocratic state, rejection of democracy and of individualism, a cult of autocratic one-man leadership and a Third Way economic policy, in between capitalism and marxism. Instead, Wilders is seen as a libertarian proponent of laissez-faire economic policy, personal autonomy, women's equality and the emancipation of homosexuals. However, te Slaa noted the extreme right-wing populism, the proposed discrimination of muslims, the islamophobia and the rejection of the legal state by Wilders. He cited Dutch prime minister Mark Rutte's characterisation of Wilders as a "political pyromaniac" because of the absence of practical solutions in Wilders' disputed islamophobic proposals.

Bibliography

Works authored by Wilders
In Dutch
 (2005) Kies voor vrijheid: een eerlijk antwoord. Groep Wilders. (Translated title: Choose freedom: an honest answer), 
 (2010) Dossier Wilders, Uitspraken van de meest besproken Nederlandse politicus van deze eeuw. House of knowledge. (Translated title: The Wilders file, Statements by the most discussed Dutch politician of this century), 

In English
 (2012) Marked for Death: Islam's War Against the West and Me. Washington DC, Regnery. ,

Secondary literature
In Dutch
 Fennema, Meindert: Geert Wilders. De tovenaarsleerling. Amsterdam, Prometheus, 2016. (Geert Wilders. The sorcerer's apprentice) , 
 Riemen, Rob: De eeuwige terugkeer van het fascisme. Atlas, Amsterdam, 2010. (The eternal return of fascism) , 
 te Slaa, Robin: Is Wilders een fascist? Amsterdam, Boom, 2012. (Is Wilders a fascist?) ,

Awards and recognition
 Oriana Fallaci Free Speech Award in 2009
 Nominated for Sakharov Prize in 2010
 Dutch Politician of the Year 2010
 Dutch Politician of the Year 2013
 Dutch Politician of the Year 2015
 Dutch Politician of the Year 2016
 The Hungarian Order of Merit in 2022

See also 

 Criticism of multiculturalism
 Multiculturalism in the Netherlands
 Philo-Semitism
 Bibliography of books critical of Islam
 Stephen Robert Morse, whose film EuroTrump covered Wilders in the run-up to the 2017 election

Notes 
  Parlement.com biography

External links 

 Geert Wilders Weblog (in Dutch)
 Geert Wilders (in Dutch), House of Representatives biography
 Geert Wilders, collected news and coverage at The New York Times

1963 births
Living people
 
20th-century Dutch politicians
21st-century Dutch politicians
Counter-jihad activists
Critics of Islamism
Critics of multiculturalism
Dutch activists
Dutch agnostics
Dutch anti-communists
Dutch critics of Islam
Dutch documentary film directors
Dutch documentary film producers
Dutch documentary filmmakers
Dutch former Christians
Dutch male screenwriters
Dutch nationalists
Dutch people of Indonesian descent
Dutch political party founders
Dutch political writers
Dutch politicians convicted of crimes
Dutch screenwriters
Dutch Zionists
Far-right politics in the Netherlands
Former Roman Catholics
Free speech activists
Independent politicians in the Netherlands
Indo people
Leaders of political parties in the Netherlands
Members of the House of Representatives (Netherlands)
Municipal councillors of The Hague
Municipal councillors of Utrecht (city)
Open University (Netherlands) alumni
Party chairs of the Netherlands
Party for Freedom
Party for Freedom politicians
People from Venlo
People's Party for Freedom and Democracy politicians
Royal Netherlands Army personnel
Islamophobia in the Netherlands